The table below is a classified table of every speedway rider to have finished in the top three of a Speedway World Championship competition.

Classification

Riders

Countries

See also 
 Motorcycle speedway

References 

!
!

pl:Medaliści indywidualnych mistrzostw świata na żużlu#Klasyfikacja medalowa